Euseius albizziae is a species of mite in the family Phytoseiidae.

References

albizziae
Articles created by Qbugbot
Animals described in 1978